Honor Among Men is a 1924 American silent film directed by Denison Clift and starring Edmund Lowe, Claire Adams and Sheldon Lewis.

Cast
 Edmund Lowe as Prince Kaloney  
 Claire Adams as Patricia Carson  
 Sheldon Lewis as King Louis  
 Diana Miller as Countess Zara De Winter  
 Frank Leigh as Renauld  
 Fred Becker as Col. Erhaupt  
 Paul Weigel as Baron Barrat  
 Hector V. Sarno as Nichols  
 Fred Malatesta as Count De Winter  
 Walter Wilkinson as Little Crown Prince

References

Bibliography
 Solomon, Aubrey. The Fox Film Corporation, 1915-1935. A History and Filmography. McFarland & Co, 2011.

External links

1924 films
Films directed by Denison Clift
American silent feature films
Fox Film films
American black-and-white films
Films based on American novels
1924 drama films
1920s English-language films
1920s American films